The Women's super-G competition at the 2017 World Championships was held on 7 February 2017.

Results
The race was started at 12:00.

References

Women's super-G
2017 in Swiss women's sport
FIS